Biomedical sciences are a set of sciences applying portions of natural science or formal science, or both, to develop knowledge, interventions, or technology that are of use in healthcare or public health.  Such disciplines as medical microbiology, clinical virology, clinical epidemiology, genetic epidemiology, and biomedical engineering are medical sciences.  In explaining physiological mechanisms operating in pathological processes, however, pathophysiology can be regarded as basic science.

Biomedical Sciences, as defined by the UK Quality Assurance Agency for Higher Education Benchmark Statement in 2015, includes those science disciplines whose primary focus is the biology of human health and disease and ranges from the generic study of biomedical sciences and human biology to more specialised subject areas such as pharmacology, human physiology and human nutrition. It is underpinned by relevant basic sciences including anatomy and physiology, cell biology, biochemistry, microbiology, genetics and molecular biology, immunology, mathematics and statistics, and bioinformatics. As such the biomedical sciences have a much wider range of academic and research activities and economic significance than that defined by hospital laboratory sciences. Biomedical Sciences are the major focus of bioscience research and funding in the 21st century.

Roles within biomedical science
A sub-set of biomedical sciences is the science of clinical laboratory diagnosis. This is commonly referred to in the UK as 'biomedical science' or 'healthcare science'. There are at least 45 different specialisms within healthcare science, which are traditionally grouped into three main divisions:
 specialisms involving life sciences
 specialisms involving physiological science
 specialisms involving medical physics or bioengineering

Life sciences specialties 

 Molecular toxicology
 Molecular pathology
 Blood transfusion science
 Cervical cytology
 Clinical biochemistry
 Clinical embryology
 Clinical immunology
 Electron microscopy
 External quality assurance
 Haematology
 Haemostasis and thrombosis
 Histocompatibility and immunogenetics
 Histopathology and cytopathology
 Molecular genetics and cytogenetics
 Molecular biology and cell biology
 Microbiology including mycology
 Bacteriology
 Tropical diseases
 Phlebotomy
 Tissue banking/transplant
 Virology

Physiological science specialisms

Physics and bioengineering specialisms

Biomedical science in the United Kingdom 
The healthcare science workforce is an important part of the UK's National Health Service. While people working in healthcare science are only 5% of the staff of the NHS, 80% of all diagnoses can be attributed to their work.

The volume of specialist healthcare science work is a significant part of the work of the NHS. Every year, NHS healthcare scientists carry out:
 nearly 1 billion pathology laboratory tests
 more than 12 million physiological tests
 support for 1.5 million fractions of radiotherapy

The four governments of the UK have recognised the importance of healthcare science to the NHS, introducing the Modernising Scientific Careers initiative to make certain that the education and training for healthcare scientists ensures there is the flexibility to meet patient needs while keeping up to date with scientific developments.
Graduates of an accredited biomedical science degree programme can also apply for the NHS' Scientist training programme, which gives successful applicants an opportunity to work in a clinical setting whilst also studying towards an MSc or Doctoral qualification.

Biomedical Science in the 20th century 
At this point in history the field of medicine was the most prevalent sub field of biomedical science, as several breakthroughs on how to treat diseases and help the immune system were made. As well as the birth of body augmentations.

1910s 
In 1912, the Institute of Biomedical Science was founded in the United Kingdom. The institute is still standing today and still regularly publishes works in the major breakthroughs in disease treatments and other breakthroughs in the field 117 years later. The IBMS today represents approximately 20,000 members employed mainly in National Health Service and private laboratories.

1920s 
In 1928, British Scientist Alexander Fleming created the first antibiotic penicillin. This was a huge breakthrough in biomedical science because it allowed for the treatment of bacterial infections.

In 1926, the first artificial pacemaker was made by Australian physician Dr. Mark C. Lidwell. This portable machine was plugged into a lighting point. One pole was applied to a skin pad soaked with strong salt solution, while the other consisted of a needle insulated  up to the point and was plunged into the appropriate cardiac chamber and the machine started. A switch was incorporated to change the polarity. The pacemaker rate ranged from about 80 to 120 pulses per minute and the voltage also variable from 1.5 to 120 volts.

1930s 
The 1930s was a huge era for biomedical research, as this was the era where antibiotics became more widespread and vaccines started to be developed. In 1935, the idea of a polio vaccine was introduced by Dr. Maurice Brodie. Brodie prepared a killed poliomyelitis  vaccine, which he then tested on chimpanzees, himself, and several children. Brodie's vaccine trials went poorly since the polio-virus became active in many of the human test subjects. Many subjects had fatal side effects, paralyzing, and causing death.

1940s 
During and after World War II, the field of biomedical science saw a new age of technology and treatment methods. For instance in 1941 the first hormonal treatment for prostate cancer was implemented by Urologist and cancer researcher Charles B. Huggins. Huggins discovered that if you remove the testicles from a man with prostate cancer, the cancer had nowhere to spread, and nothing to feed on thus putting the subject into remission. This advancement lead to the development of hormonal blocking drugs, which is less invasive and still used today. At the tail end of this decade, the first bone marrow transplant was done on a mouse in 1949. The surgery was conducted by Dr. Leon O. Jacobson, he discovered that he could transplant bone marrow and spleen tissues in a mouse that had both no bone marrow and a destroyed spleen. The procedure is still used in modern medicine today and is responsible for saving countless lives.

1950s 
In the 1950s, we saw innovation in technology across all fields, but most importantly there were many breakthroughs which led to modern medicine. On 6 March 1953, Dr. Jonas Salk announced the completion of the first successful killed-virus Polio vaccine. The vaccine was tested on about 1.6 million Canadian, American, and Finnish children in 1954. The vaccine was announced as safe on 12 April 1955.

See also 

 Biomedical research institution Austral University Hospital

References

External links
Extraordinary You: Case studies of Healthcare scientists in the UK's National Health Service
National Institute of Environmental Health Sciences
The US National Library of Medicine
National Health Service

Health sciences
Health care occupations
Science occupations